Biscayne Bay Street Circuit was a street circuit which was only used on 14 March 2015 for the 2015 Miami ePrix of Formula E. The track is located in the heart of Downtown Miami, running along the coast of Biscayne Bay, in addition to making its way underneath the MacArthur Causeway and around the AmericanAirlines Arena, the home of NBA basketball team Miami Heat. The track features eight turns. Production of the temporary street circuit was done by track design company Ayesa.

Driver comments

Franck Montagny, Andretti: "We can expect a very good event there because, looking at the track, there will be quite a few long straights and slow corners so this will help for overtaking for sure. Turns 1, 2 and 3 will be the tricky part of the circuit where we shall have to look after the car and be careful of contact, for example. It looks as though we shall be able to attack at turns 4, 5, 6, 7, 8 and in to 1 - these are the corners to make some moves on."

See also
Grand Prix of Miami (open wheel racing)

References

Formula E circuits
Miami ePrix
Motorsport venues in Florida
Defunct motorsport venues in the United States